Irish Site is a historic site in East Auburn, Maine.

The site is also known as "Site #24.32, Maine Archeological Survey."  It was added to the National Historic Register in 1992.

References

Archaeological sites on the National Register of Historic Places in Maine
Auburn, Maine
National Register of Historic Places in Androscoggin County, Maine